Istituto Italiano Statale Comprensivo di Barcellona or the Istituto Italiano Statale Comprensivo "Edoardo Amaldi" is an Italian international school in Barcelona, Catalonia, Spain. Owned by the Italian government, it consists of three parts: Scuole secondarie "Edoardo Amaldi", Scuola primaria "Maria Montessori" and scuola dell'infanzia riconosciuta "Maria Montessori". The school administration and liceo (senior high school/sixth form college) occupy one campus, while all other classes are in a Sarrià facility.

See also

Spanish international schools in Italy:
 Liceo Español Cervantes

References

External links
  

International schools in Barcelona
Italian international schools in Spain